Kim Kyong-il (born 11 December 1988 in Pyongyang) is a North Korean international football player. He plays for Rimyongsu in the DPR Korea League.

He has played on seven occasions for the North Korean national team. In May, 2010, he was called up to the North Korean 23-man squad for the 2010 FIFA World Cup. He had previously played as part of the North Korean team in the 2008 AFC Challenge Cup.

References

External links

Kim Kyong-il at DPRKFootball

1988 births
Living people
North Korean footballers
Association football midfielders
Association football forwards
North Korea international footballers
2010 FIFA World Cup players
Rimyongsu Sports Club players